"Do Me Wrong" is the debut solo single by Melanie Blatt of All Saints, credited as Mel Blatt on the single cover. It peaked at #18 in the UK charts.

Track list

Charts

Video
The video, directed by Si&Ad (that is Simon Atkinson and Adam Townley), is based on the G Town Radio Edit of the song and features Melanie Blatt in a car in the desert in Spain trying to get away from her unfaithful boyfriend.

Remixes
Do Me Wrong
 Extended Version
 G Town Radio Edit
 Nu G Town Radio Edit
 Roguetraders Dub
 Roguetraders Radio Edit
 Roguetraders Vocal 12 inch
 Themroc 12 inch Dub
 Themroc 12 inch Vocal Mix

2003 debut singles
Melanie Blatt songs
Song recordings produced by Xenomania
2003 songs
Songs written by Brian Higgins (producer)
London Records singles
Songs written by Stuart Zender
2003 singles